Walnut Street Historic District is a national historic district located at Muncie, Delaware County, Indiana. It encompasses 66 contributing buildings and 1 contributing object, and is located in the central business district of Muncie.  The district includes notable examples of Italianate, Late Victorian, Colonial Revival, and Beaux-Arts style architecture.  Located in the district are the separately listed Moore-Youse-Maxon House, Roberts Hotel, and Goddard Warehouse.  Other notable buildings include the Patterson Bock (c. 1876), McNaughton Block (1901-1903), Mitchell Block (1909), American National Bank Building (1924), Marsh Block (1888), and the Old Post Office designed by the Office of the Supervising Architect under James Knox Taylor (1907, 1930).

It was added to the National Register of Historic Places in 1989.

References

External links

Historic districts on the National Register of Historic Places in Indiana
Colonial Revival architecture in Indiana
Victorian architecture in Indiana
Beaux-Arts architecture in Indiana
Historic districts in Muncie, Indiana
National Register of Historic Places in Muncie, Indiana